Kyra Zagorsky (born June 6, 1976) is an American film and television actress. She has acted in the TV series Helix, the film The Pastor's Wife and season eight of the TV series Supernatural.

Early life
Zagorsky was born in New York and raised in the mountains in a small town in Colorado. She grew up in the outdoors, and was an athlete and dancer throughout school. She began acting in her senior year of high school, when she auditioned for the school musical and was cast as one of the leads.

Zagorsky went on to receive a bachelor of fine arts in theatre from Southern Oregon University in Ashland. In 2006, she earned a master of fine arts degree in acting from the University of California, Irvine. Zagorsky has also trained in various martial arts over the years, including kickboxing, capoeira, and Filipino stick and sword fighting.

Career
Zagorsky's most notable role was Dr. Julia Walker in Helix. She had guest-star appearances in SyFy's Continuum (TV series) in its final season, as well as Stargate: Atlantis and Stargate Universe SGU, The CW's Supernatural, FOX's Fringe, TNT's Falling Skies and in the award-winning web series Divine. Zagorsky took on a lead role in the film The ABCs of Death, "a 26-chapter anthology that showcases death in all its vicious wonder and brutal beauty", which premiered at the 2012 Toronto International Film Festival and in the zombie horror film Toxin 3D.

Personal life
Zagorsky is married to actor Patrick Sabongui. They have a son and a daughter.

Filmography

Film

Television

Staff credits

References

External links

 

1976 births
American television actresses
Actresses from New York (state)
Southern Oregon University alumni
University of California, Irvine alumni
Living people
American film actresses
Actresses from Colorado
21st-century American women